Persoonia filiformis is a species of flowering plant in the family Proteaceae and is endemic to the south-west of Western Australia.

Description
Flowering occurs from November to December.

Taxonomy
Persoonia filiformis was first formally described in 1994 by Peter Weston in the journal Telopea from specimens he collected near the turnoff to Jurien Bay from the Brand Highway in 1980.

Distribution and habitat
This geebung grows in low heath between the Arrowsmith River and Badgingarra in the south-west of Western Australia.

Conservation status
Persoonia filiformis is classified as "Priority Three" by the Government of Western Australia Department of Parks and Wildlife meaning that it is poorly known and known from only a few locations but is not under imminent threat.

References

filiformis
Flora of Western Australia
Plants described in 1994
Taxa named by Peter H. Weston